The Hoxha I Government (Albanian: Qeveria e Parë e Enver Hoxhës) better known as the Democratic Government of Albania was established on 20 October 1944 by the National Liberation Movement, as the Albanian partisan resistance of 1940–1944 came to a close. A provisional government took power after the liberation of the country from German forces on 28 November. Its interim Prime Minister was Secretary-General Enver Hoxha of the Communist Party of Albania. The interim government was to be in existence until the holding of elections and the convening of a Constituent Assembly.

The government was led by the National Liberation Movement (LNÇ), which in turn was dominated by the Communist Party.  From the outset, the Democratic Government was a Communist state.  It sidelined the nationalist Balli Kombëtar, a task made somewhat easier by large amounts of British support. King Zog I was effectively dethroned; the Democratic Government barred him from ever returning to the country. The LNÇ quickly established fraternal relationships with other Communist countries.

Elections were held on 2 December 1945.  By this time, the LNÇ had transformed itself into the Democratic Front of Albania, which was the only organization to contest the election.  On 10 January 1946, the People's Republic of Albania was proclaimed.

Cabinet
 Enver Hoxha - Prime Minister, Minister of Foreign Affairs and National Defense
 Koçi Xoxe - Deputy Prime Minister, Minister of Internal Affairs and Chairman of the Audit Committee
 Tuk Jakova - Minister Without Portfolio, February 6, 1946 Minister of Industry
 Haxhi Lleshi - Minister Without Portfolio
 Manol Konomi - Minister of Justice, 6 May 1947 - 5 February 1948 Minister Ad. Interim Education
 Spiro Koleka - Minister of World Affairs
 Ramadan Çitaku - Kiço Ngjela (6 February 1948) - Minister of Finances
 Nako Spiru - Minister of Economy, March 13, 1947 - President of the State Plan Committee
 Medar Shtylla - Minister of Health
 Gaqo Tashko - Minister of Agriculture
 Sejfulla Malëshova (Naxhije Dume, 6 February 1948) - Minister of Education
 Gogo Nushi (January 31, 1947 - Minister of Commerce
 Nesti Kerenxhi - Minister Without Portfolio and President of the State Plan Commission (May 29, 1948)
 Pandi Kristo - Minister Without Portfolio (1946) and Head of State Control (1947)
 Mehmet Shehu - Minister of Communications and PTT (February 6, 1948)

See also
 History of Albania

External links
 Declaration of the Democratic Government of Albania at the 2nd Meeting of the Anti-Fascist National Liberation Council of Albania
 Speech to the Constituent Assembly on the Presentation of the Resignation of the Government

References

G42
1946 disestablishments in Albania
Albania
Albania in World War II
1944 establishments in Albania
Albania
Albania